Kyung I. Lah (born August 27, 1971) is a South Korean-American journalist and correspondent for CNN based in the U.S.

Early life and education 
Lah was born in Seoul, South Korea, and grew up in Streamwood, Illinois, Lah graduated in 1989 from Hoffman Estates High School in Hoffman Estates, Illinois.  She earned a bachelor's degree in broadcast journalism from the University of Illinois at Urbana-Champaign in 1993.  She was also a writer for the school's Daily Illini newspaper.

Career 
Lah began her career in 1993 as a desk assistant and field producer at WBBM-TV in Chicago.  In 1994, she became an on-air reporter for WWMT-TV in Kalamazoo, Michigan.  In 1995, she joined KGTV-TV in San Diego as a reporter.

In January 2000, she returned to WBBM-TV as an on-air reporter.

In early 2003, Lah moved to Los Angeles to take a job at KNBC-TV in Los Angeles, where she was a morning reporter and a midday anchor. The Chicago Sun-Times reported at the time that Lah had turned down a "half-hearted (contract) renewal offer" from WBBM-TV.

Despite receiving high praise from management, Lah was allegedly fired from KNBC-TV in Los Angeles in March 2005 for an alleged affair with her field producer Jeff Soto. They were both married at the time and Lah's husband also worked for NBC in the Los Angeles area.

In late 2005, Lah joined CNN Newsource as a Washington, D.C.-based correspondent.

In November 2007, Lah became CNN's Tokyo-based correspondent. A Japanese interpreter always accompanied her.  On June 27, 2012, Lah left her post in Japan for a position at the CNN bureau in Los Angeles.

Controversy
Lah has written extensively about Japanese subculture, specializing in men who have married animated characters. As a result, she has been criticized by the Japanese and international blogosphere for focusing on the irregular outliers of Japan and for allowing her racial bias to influence what she reports on, rather than the hard-hitting news that was expected from her as a reporter for an international broadcasting company.

Personal life 
Lah has declared that she holds a very strong South Korean identity. In a 2006 interview with Dynamic-Korea, she revealed that she "[thinks] about the larger question of being Korean every single moment."

See also 

CNN

References

External links 
 Kyung Lah at Cable News Network

1971 births
CNN people
Living people
American reporters and correspondents
American women television journalists
People from Streamwood, Illinois
People from Seoul
South Korean emigrants to the United States
South Korean expatriates in Japan
South Korean women journalists
University of Illinois Urbana-Champaign College of Media alumni
Journalists from Illinois
Hoffman Estates High School alumni
21st-century American women